The Orenburg constituency (No.142) is a Russian legislative constituency in Orenburg Oblast. Until 2007 the constituency covered the entirety of Orenburg and central Orenburg Oblast, however, since 2016 Orenburg constituency covers only half of Orenburg and southwestern Orenburg Oblast.

Members elected

Election results

1993

|-
! colspan=2 style="background-color:#E9E9E9;text-align:left;vertical-align:top;" |Candidate
! style="background-color:#E9E9E9;text-align:left;vertical-align:top;" |Party
! style="background-color:#E9E9E9;text-align:right;" |Votes
! style="background-color:#E9E9E9;text-align:right;" |%
|-
|style="background-color:"|
|align=left|Tamara Zlotnikova
|align=left|Yavlinsky—Boldyrev—Lukin
|
|23.91%
|-
|style="background-color:"|
|align=left|Aleksandr Zelepukhin
|align=left|Agrarian Party
| -
|22.00%
|-
| colspan="5" style="background-color:#E9E9E9;"|
|- style="font-weight:bold"
| colspan="3" style="text-align:left;" | Total
| 
| 100%
|-
| colspan="5" style="background-color:#E9E9E9;"|
|- style="font-weight:bold"
| colspan="4" |Source:
|
|}

1995

|-
! colspan=2 style="background-color:#E9E9E9;text-align:left;vertical-align:top;" |Candidate
! style="background-color:#E9E9E9;text-align:left;vertical-align:top;" |Party
! style="background-color:#E9E9E9;text-align:right;" |Votes
! style="background-color:#E9E9E9;text-align:right;" |%
|-
|style="background-color:"|
|align=left|Tamara Zlotnikova (incumbent)
|align=left|Yabloko
|
|30.25%
|-
|style="background-color:"|
|align=left|Yury Nikiforenko
|align=left|Communist Party
|
|14.75%
|-
|style="background-color:"|
|align=left|Vladimir Kanyukov
|align=left|Independent
|
|6.65%
|-
|style="background-color:#295EC4"|
|align=left|Rakhim Suleymanov
|align=left|Party of Economic Freedom
|
|6.11%
|-
|style="background-color:"|
|align=left|Aleksandr Kits
|align=left|Liberal Democratic Party
|
|3.94%
|-
|style="background-color:"|
|align=left|Ivan Solodovnikov
|align=left|Agrarian Party
|
|3.42%
|-
|style="background-color:#2C299A"|
|align=left|Vyacheslav Kuzmin
|align=left|Congress of Russian Communities
|
|3.31%
|-
|style="background-color:"|
|align=left|Aleksandr Romanov
|align=left|Independent
|
|3.26%
|-
|style="background-color:"|
|align=left|Lyudmila Kovalevskaya
|align=left|Independent
|
|3.02%
|-
|style="background-color:"|
|align=left|Stanislav Vasilyev
|align=left|Independent
|
|2.18%
|-
|style="background-color:"|
|align=left|Gennady Medvedev
|align=left|Independent
|
|2.13%
|-
|style="background-color:"|
|align=left|Dmitry Mankov
|align=left|Kedr
|
|1.90%
|-
|style="background-color:#1C1A0D"|
|align=left|Aleksandr Golovanov
|align=left|Forward, Russia!
|
|1.63%
|-
|style="background-color:#3A46CE"|
|align=left|Boris Savitsky
|align=left|Democratic Choice of Russia – United Democrats
|
|1.59%
|-
|style="background-color:#DA2021"|
|align=left|Aleksey Tsaryov
|align=left|Ivan Rybkin Bloc
|
|1.45%
|-
|style="background-color:#DD137B"|
|align=left|Yevgeny Gerasimov
|align=left|Social Democrats
|
|0.94%
|-
|style="background-color:"|
|align=left|Mikhail Loshakrev
|align=left|Independent
|
|0.82%
|-
|style="background-color:"|
|align=left|Sergey Yelistratov
|align=left|Independent
|
|0.65%
|-
|style="background-color:"|
|align=left|Mikhail Makarov
|align=left|Independent
|
|0.33%
|-
|style="background-color:#CE1100"|
|align=left|Yevgeny Kotolevsky
|align=left|My Fatherland
|
|0.31%
|-
|style="background-color:#000000"|
|colspan=2 |against all
|
|7.91%
|-
| colspan="5" style="background-color:#E9E9E9;"|
|- style="font-weight:bold"
| colspan="3" style="text-align:left;" | Total
| 
| 100%
|-
| colspan="5" style="background-color:#E9E9E9;"|
|- style="font-weight:bold"
| colspan="4" |Source:
|
|}

1999

|-
! colspan=2 style="background-color:#E9E9E9;text-align:left;vertical-align:top;" |Candidate
! style="background-color:#E9E9E9;text-align:left;vertical-align:top;" |Party
! style="background-color:#E9E9E9;text-align:right;" |Votes
! style="background-color:#E9E9E9;text-align:right;" |%
|-
|style="background-color:"|
|align=left|Yury Nikiforenko
|align=left|Communist Party
|
|21.92%
|-
|style="background-color:"|
|align=left|Tamara Zlotnikova (incumbent)
|align=left|Yabloko
|
|20.22%
|-
|style="background-color:"|
|align=left|Aleksandr Zaveryukha
|align=left|Our Home – Russia
|
|11.98%
|-
|style="background-color:"|
|align=left|Andrey Sukhov
|align=left|Independent
|
|10.83%
|-
|style="background-color:"|
|align=left|Tamara Semivelichenko
|align=left|Independent
|
|5.41%
|-
|style="background-color:"|
|align=left|Aleksandr Kits
|align=left|Liberal Democratic Party
|
|3.93%
|-
|style="background-color:"|
|align=left|Nina Kulikova
|align=left|Independent
|
|3.79%
|-
|style="background-color:#E98282"|
|align=left|Nina Setko
|align=left|Women of Russia
|
|2.73%
|-
|style="background-color:#D50000"|
|align=left|Rinat Ziganshin
|align=left|Communists and Workers of Russia - for the Soviet Union
|
|2.47%
|-
|style="background-color:"|
|align=left|Radik Sagitov
|align=left|Independent
|
|1.59%
|-
|style="background-color:#084284"|
|align=left|Valentina Leontyeva
|align=left|Spiritual Heritage
|
|1.52%
|-
|style="background-color:"|
|align=left|Ivan Zemlyanushin
|align=left|Independent
|
|0.66%
|-
|style="background-color:#020266"|
|align=left|Sergey Stolpak
|align=left|Russian Socialist Party
|
|0.61%
|-
|style="background-color:#000000"|
|colspan=2 |against all
|
|9.99%
|-
| colspan="5" style="background-color:#E9E9E9;"|
|- style="font-weight:bold"
| colspan="3" style="text-align:left;" | Total
| 
| 100%
|-
| colspan="5" style="background-color:#E9E9E9;"|
|- style="font-weight:bold"
| colspan="4" |Source:
|
|}

2003

|-
! colspan=2 style="background-color:#E9E9E9;text-align:left;vertical-align:top;" |Candidate
! style="background-color:#E9E9E9;text-align:left;vertical-align:top;" |Party
! style="background-color:#E9E9E9;text-align:right;" |Votes
! style="background-color:#E9E9E9;text-align:right;" |%
|-
|style="background-color:"|
|align=left|Aleksandr Kogan
|align=left|United Russia
|
|26.01%
|-
|style="background-color:"|
|align=left|Viktor Pyatnitsky
|align=left|Independent
|
|18.02%
|-
|style="background-color:"|
|align=left|Yury Nikiforenko (incumbent)
|align=left|Communist Party
|
|13.92%
|-
|style="background-color:"|
|align=left|Vladimir Frolov
|align=left|Independent
|
|10.55%
|-
|style="background-color:"|
|align=left|Yelena Afanasyeva
|align=left|Liberal Democratic Party
|
|5.30%
|-
|style="background-color:#FFD700"|
|align=left|Anna Shchetinskaya
|align=left|People's Party
|
|4.85%
|-
|style="background:#1042A5"| 
|align=left|Nikolay Stepanov
|align=left|Union of Right Forces
|
|2.02%
|-
|style="background:"| 
|align=left|Viktor Balabanov
|align=left|Yabloko
|
|1.99%
|-
|style="background:#408080"| 
|align=left|Sergey Kelep
|align=left|For a Holy Russia
|
|0.86%
|-
|style="background-color:"|
|align=left|Andrey Sukhov
|align=left|Independent
|
|0.71%
|-
|style="background-color:#164C8C"|
|align=left|Viktor Serovatov
|align=left|United Russian Party Rus'
|
|0.34%
|-
|style="background-color:#000000"|
|colspan=2 |against all
|
|12.05%
|-
| colspan="5" style="background-color:#E9E9E9;"|
|- style="font-weight:bold"
| colspan="3" style="text-align:left;" | Total
| 
| 100%
|-
| colspan="5" style="background-color:#E9E9E9;"|
|- style="font-weight:bold"
| colspan="4" |Source:
|
|}

2016

|-
! colspan=2 style="background-color:#E9E9E9;text-align:left;vertical-align:top;" |Candidate
! style="background-color:#E9E9E9;text-align:left;vertical-align:top;" |Party
! style="background-color:#E9E9E9;text-align:right;" |Votes
! style="background-color:#E9E9E9;text-align:right;" |%
|-
|style="background-color: " |
|align=left|Yury Mishcheryakov
|align=left|United Russia
|
|42.42%
|-
|style="background-color:"|
|align=left|Aleksandr Karpov
|align=left|Liberal Democratic Party
|
|15.17%
|-
|style="background-color:"|
|align=left|Maksim Amelin
|align=left|Communist Party
|
|11.26%
|-
|style="background-color:"|
|align=left|Vladimir Frolov
|align=left|A Just Russia
|
|11.15%
|-
|style="background:"| 
|align=left|Aleksandr Kalinin
|align=left|Communists of Russia
|
|7.60%
|-
|style="background:"| 
|align=left|Vladimir Tishin
|align=left|Yabloko
|
|2.36%
|-
|style="background-color:"|
|align=left|Sergey Fomin
|align=left|Party of Growth
|
|2.18%
|-
|style="background:"| 
|align=left|Sergey Khimich
|align=left|Patriots of Russia
|
|1.54%
|-
|style="background-color:"|
|align=left|Anton Rychagov
|align=left|Rodina
|
|1.52%
|-
|style="background:"| 
|align=left|Sergey Stolpak
|align=left|People's Freedom Party
|
|1.01%
|-
| colspan="5" style="background-color:#E9E9E9;"|
|- style="font-weight:bold"
| colspan="3" style="text-align:left;" | Total
| 
| 100%
|-
| colspan="5" style="background-color:#E9E9E9;"|
|- style="font-weight:bold"
| colspan="4" |Source:
|
|}

2021

|-
! colspan=2 style="background-color:#E9E9E9;text-align:left;vertical-align:top;" |Candidate
! style="background-color:#E9E9E9;text-align:left;vertical-align:top;" |Party
! style="background-color:#E9E9E9;text-align:right;" |Votes
! style="background-color:#E9E9E9;text-align:right;" |%
|-
|style="background-color: " |
|align=left|Andrey Anikeyev
|align=left|United Russia
|
|36.75%
|-
|style="background-color:"|
|align=left|Nurlan Munzhasarov
|align=left|Communist Party
|
|24.21%
|-
|style="background-color:"|
|align=left|Yekaterina Kalegina
|align=left|A Just Russia — For Truth
|
|9.96%
|-
|style="background-color: " |
|align=left|Aleksey Marinin
|align=left|New People
|
|7.25%
|-
|style="background-color:"|
|align=left|Vadim Bikbov
|align=left|Liberal Democratic Party
|
|7.17%
|-
|style="background-color: "|
|align=left|Vadim Khuzhakhmetov
|align=left|Party of Pensioners
|
|4.94%
|-
|style="background: "| 
|align=left|Mikhail Mordvintsev
|align=left|Civic Platform
|
|2.15%
|-
|style="background: "| 
|align=left|Yury Shchekin
|align=left|Yabloko
|
|1.69%
|-
| colspan="5" style="background-color:#E9E9E9;"|
|- style="font-weight:bold"
| colspan="3" style="text-align:left;" | Total
| 
| 100%
|-
| colspan="5" style="background-color:#E9E9E9;"|
|- style="font-weight:bold"
| colspan="4" |Source:
|
|}

Notes

References

Russian legislative constituencies
Politics of Orenburg Oblast